The Bill of Rights Institute (BRI) is a nonprofit educational organization based in Arlington, Virginia, that develops educational resources on American history and government, provides professional development opportunities to teachers, and runs student programs and scholarship contests. It has been described as promoting a conservative view of the United States Constitution.

History
BRI was founded in September 1999 by industrialist Charles Koch and the Charles G. Koch Charitable Foundation. BRI's first president, Victoria Hughes, was a teacher who had also held a number of executive roles in other non-profit organizations. Hughes led the organization for a decade until her departure, after which Tony Woodlief filled her position as president. David Bobb, a former Hillsdale College professor and head of its Allan P. Kirby, Jr. Center for Constitutional Studies and Citizenship, became BRI's president in December 2013.

Koch has explained that he became concerned with education in the field of constitutional law after he saw that many high school teachers had inadequate resources to develop educational materials on the principles, institutions, and ideas upon which the United States was founded.

Organization operations

Professional development
BRI runs educational programs for teachers around the country. BRI conducted 64 constitutional seminars in the 2010–2011 school year, often held at historic sites such as George Washington’s Mount Vernon or James Madison’s Montpelier.  Seminars include instruction from a university professor and training by a BRI master teacher. BRI professors include BRI  board member and Professor of Law at George Mason University Todd Zywicki; author and professor of public policy at Pepperdine University Dr. Gordon Lloyd; University of Texas School of Law and Professor Dr. H.W. Perry, Jr. BRI says it has reached over 22,000 teachers through professional development seminars.

Online educational resources
In August 2014, Bill of Rights Institute launched Documents of Freedom, a free digital course on history, government, and economics. The course builds on excerpts from over 100 primary sources, including the Federalist and Anti-Federalist papers, presidential speeches, Supreme Court cases, and the Founding documents; and it offers an extensive set of original essays, focusing on principles such as federalism, separation of powers, limited government, checks and balances, republican government, consent of the governed, natural rights, rule of law, and due process, as well as virtues like self-governance, humility, integrity, justice, perseverance, respect, contribution, and responsibility.

Student programs
In 2006, BRI began a high school essay contest which asks students to reflect on civic values. Individuals who have taken part in the awards weekend include Supreme Court Justices Sandra Day O’Connor and Clarence Thomas, journalist John Stossel, journalist and political analyst Juan Williams, Judge Andrew Napolitano, and NBA player Antawn Jamison.

Other student programs run by BRI include the Constitutional Academy, which provides students with a six-week study of the Constitution in Washington, D.C. In 2011 the Ford Motor Company Fund provided scholarships to eleven students to attend the Constitutional Academy.

References

External links 
 Bill of Rights Institute website

Non-profit organizations based in Arlington, Virginia
Charities based in Virginia
Conservative organizations in the United States